Richard J. Karth (born December 13, 1952) is an American professional historic motorsport and stock car racing driver. As a vintage racer, he pilots the No. 90 formerly owned by Donlavey Racing in conjunction with the Midwestern Council of Sports Car Clubs. He last competed part-time in the NASCAR Xfinity Series, driving the No. 61 Chevrolet Camaro for MBM Motorsports.

Vintage racing

Growing up a racing fan, he watched quarter midget events at the Shawano County, Wisconsin fairgrounds alongside his father and uncle who owned a funeral home that operated an ambulance for drivers. He began regularly attending the Indianapolis 500 in 1968.

In 2005, he acquired the No. 90 NASCAR stock car formerly driven by Dick Trickle of Donlavey Racing; Karth and Trickle befriended each other in the 1980s thanks to a mutual friend. With the car, he started competing in vintage racing for the Midwestern Council of Sports Car Clubs.

He is a member of the Southeastern Wisconsin Short Track Hall of Fame's Board of Directors.

ARCA and NASCAR career

During the 2000s, he worked as a crewman for various NASCAR teams, including Dexter Bean's NASCAR Cup Series crew.

In 2013, he received a road course license to participate in the ARCA Racing Series at Road America, but was unable to compete as his car failed to start. He returned to the series in 2017, where he finished 21st in his ARCA debut at Road America. The following year, he tested a car for Mullins Racing at Daytona International Speedway; he was 56th fastest. He continued racing in his home state at the Madison International Speedway events in 2018 and 2019 with Fast Track Racing Enterprises, finishing 18th and 16th, respectively.

In August 2019, MBM Motorsports announced Karth would make his NASCAR Xfinity Series debut with the team in the CTECH Manufacturing 180 at Road America; with Karth at the age of 66, MBM stated their pride in being a "gateway for so many racers, young and old, to accomplish their goals." Driving the No. 61 Toyota Camry with Dick Trickle Memorial Project branding, he remained on the lead lap through the opening stage before being substituted for Timmy Hill for the rest of the race; Hill finished 30th, though Karth received the points as he started the race.

Motorsports career results

NASCAR
(key) (Bold – Pole position awarded by qualifying time. Italics – Pole position earned by points standings or practice time. * – Most laps led.)

Xfinity Series

ARCA Menards Series
(key) (Bold – Pole position awarded by qualifying time. Italics – Pole position earned by points standings or practice time. * – Most laps led.)

 Season still in progress
 Ineligible for series points

References

External links

 

1952 births
Living people
ARCA Menards Series drivers
NASCAR drivers
Racing drivers from Wisconsin
People from Grafton, Wisconsin